The Boston Marathon is an annual marathon race hosted by several cities and towns in greater Boston in eastern Massachusetts, United States. It is traditionally held on Patriots' Day, the third Monday of April. Begun in 1897, the event was inspired by the success of the first marathon competition in the 1896 Summer Olympics. The Boston Marathon is the world's oldest annual marathon and ranks as one of the world's best-known road racing events. It is one of six World Marathon Majors. Its course runs from Hopkinton in southern Middlesex County to Copley Square in Boston.

The Boston Athletic Association (B.A.A.) has organized this event annually since 1897, except for 2020 when it was canceled due to the COVID-19 pandemic. In 2021, it was held later, in October. The race has been managed by DMSE Sports, Inc., since 1988. Amateur and professional runners from all over the world compete in the Boston Marathon each year, braving the hilly Massachusetts terrain and varying weather to take part in the race.

The event attracts 500,000 spectators each year, making it New England's most widely viewed sporting event. Starting with just 15 participants in 1897, the event now attracts an average of about 30,000 registered participants each year, with 30,251 people entering in 2015. The Centennial Boston Marathon in 1996 established a record as the world's largest marathon with 38,708 entrants, 36,748 starters, and 35,868 finishers.

History

The Boston Marathon was first run in April 1897, having been inspired by the revival of the marathon for the 1896 Summer Olympics in Athens, Greece. Until 2020 it was the oldest continuously running marathon, and the second longest continuously running footrace in North America, having debuted five months after the Buffalo Turkey Trot.

On April 19, 1897, ten years after the establishment of the B.A.A., the association held the  marathon to conclude its athletic competition, the B.A.A. Games. The inaugural winner was John J. "JJ" McDermott, who ran the 24.5 mile course in 2:55:10, leading a field of 15. The event was scheduled for the recently established holiday of Patriots' Day, with the race linking the Athenian and American struggles for liberty. The race, which became known as the Boston Marathon, has been held every year since then, even during the World War years & the Great Depression, making it the world's oldest annual marathon.

The Boston Marathon was originally a local event, but its fame and status have attracted runners from all over the world. For most of its history, the Boston Marathon was a free event, and the only prize awarded for winning the race was a wreath woven from olive branches. However, corporate-sponsored cash prizes began to be awarded in the 1980s, when professional athletes refused to run the race unless a cash award was available. The first cash prize for winning the marathon was awarded in 1986.

Walter A. Brown was the President of the Boston Athletic Association from 1941 to 1964. During the height of the Korean War in 1951, Brown denied Koreans entry into the Boston Marathon. He stated: "While American soldiers are fighting and dying in Korea, every Korean should be fighting to protect his country instead of training for marathons. As long as the war continues there, we positively will not accept Korean entries for our race on April 19."

Bobbi Gibb, Kathrine Switzer, and Nina Kuscik
The Boston Marathon rule book until after the 1967 race made no mention of gender, nor did the Amateur Athletic Union (AAU) exclude women from races that included men until after the 1967 Boston Marathon. Roberta "Bobbi" Gibb's attempt to register for the 1966 race was refused by race director Will Cloney in a letter in which he claimed women were physiologically incapable of running 26 miles.
Gibb nevertheless ran unregistered and finished the 1966 race in three hours, twenty-one minutes and forty seconds, ahead of two-thirds of the runners. Much later, she would later be recognized by the race organizers as the first woman to run the entire Boston Marathon. 

In 1967, Kathrine Switzer, who registered for the race using her official AAU registration number, paying the entry fee, providing a properly acquired fitness certificate, and signing her entry form with her usual signature 'K. V. Switzer', was the first woman to run and finish with a valid official race registration. As a result of Switzer's completion of the race as the first officially registered woman runner, the AAU changed its rules to ban women from competing in races against men. Switzer finished the race despite an infamous incident in which race official Jock Semple repeatedly assaulted her in an attempt to rip off her race numbers and eject her from the race.  

Nina Kuscsik was instrumental in influencing the Amateur Athletic Union, in late 1971, to increase its maximum distance for sanctioned women's races, leading to official participation by women in marathons, beginning at Boston in 1972. Kuscsik was the first woman to officially win the Boston Marathon, which occurred in 1972. 

In 1996, the B.A.A. retroactively recognized as champions the unofficial women's leaders of 1966 through 1971. In 2015, about 46 percent of the entrants were female.

Rosie Ruiz, the impostor
In 1980, Rosie Ruiz crossed the finish line first in the women's race. However, marathon officials became suspicious, and it was discovered that Ruiz did not appear in race videotapes until near the end of the race, with a subsequent investigation concluding that Ruiz had skipped most of the race and blended into the crowd about a half-mile (800m) from the finish line, where she then ran to her false victory. 

Eight days later, Ruiz was disqualified, and Canadian Jacqueline Gareau was proclaimed the winner.

Participant deaths
In 1905, James Edward Brooks of North Adams, Massachusetts, died of pneumonia shortly after running the marathon. In 1996, a 61-year-old Swedish man, Humphrey Siesage, died of a heart attack during the 100th running. In 2002, Cynthia Lucero, 28, died of hyponatremia.

2011: Geoffrey Mutai and the IAAF

On April 18, 2011, Geoffrey Mutai of Kenya won the 2011 Boston Marathon in a time of 2:03:02:00. Although this was the fastest marathon ever run at the time, the International Association of Athletics Federations noted that the performance was not eligible for world record status given that the course did not satisfy rules that regarded elevation drop and start/finish separation (the latter requirement being intended to prevent advantages gained from a strong tailwind, as was the case in 2011). The Associated Press (AP) reported that Mutai had the support of other runners who describe the IAAF's rules as "flawed". According to the Boston Herald, race director Dave McGillivray said he was sending paperwork to the IAAF in an attempt to have Mutai's mark ratified as a world record. Although this was not successful, the AP indicated that the attempt to have the mark certified as a world record "would force the governing bodies to reject an unprecedented performance on the world's most prestigious marathon course".

2013: Bombing

On April 15, 2013, the Boston Marathon was still in progress at 2:49p.m. The race was halted, preventing many from finishing. Three spectators were killed and an estimated 264 were injured. Entrants who completed at least half the course and did not finish due to the bombing were given automatic entry in 2014. In 2015, Dzhokhar Tsarnaev, one of the perpetrators of the bombing, was found guilty of 30 federal offenses in connection with the attack and was sentenced to death. His brother Tamerlan died after a gunfight with police and after Dzhokhar ran him over with a vehicle.

2014: Women's race disqualification
Bizunesh Deba of Ethiopia was eventually named women's winner of the 2014 Boston Marathon, following the disqualification of Kenyan Rita Jeptoo from the event due to confirmed doping. Deba finished in a time of 2:19:59, and became the course record holder. Her performance bested that of Margaret Okayo, who ran a time of 2:20:43 in 2002.

2016: Bobbi Gibb as grand marshal
In the 2016 Boston Marathon, Jami Marseilles, an American, became the first female double amputee to finish the Boston Marathon. Bobbi Gibb, the first woman to have run the entire Boston Marathon (1966), was the grand marshal of the race. The Women's Open division winner, Atsede Baysa, gave Gibb her trophy; Gibb said that she would go to Baysa's native Ethiopia in 2017 and return it to her.

2020: Cancellation

Due to the COVID-19 pandemic, the 2020 Boston Marathon was initially rescheduled from April 20 to September 14. It was the first postponement in the more than 100 year uninterrupted history of the event. 

On May 28, 2020, it was announced that the rescheduled marathon set for September 14 was canceled. Boston Mayor Marty Walsh said of the decision to cancel the race, "There's no way to hold this usual race format without bringing large numbers of people into close proximity. While our goal and our hope was to make progress in containing the virus and recovering our economy, this kind of event would not be responsible or realistic on September 14 or any time this year."

Runners were issued full refunds of entry fees. Organizers later staged a "virtual alternative" in September 2020 as the 124th running of the marathon.
|prev = 2019
|next = 2021

2021: Rescheduled to October

On October 28, 2020, the B.A.A. announced that the 2021 edition of the marathon would not be held in April; organizers stated that they hoped to stage the event later in the year, possibly in the autumn. In late January 2021, organizers announced October 11 as the date for the marathon, contingent upon road races being allowed in Massachusetts at that time. In March, organizers announced that the field would be limited to 20,000 runners. The race will be the fourth of the five World Marathon Majors held in 2021; all the events in the series are being run in the space of six weeks between late September and early November. In 2021, the B.A.A. also offered a virtual alternative to the in person race to be completed anytime between 8-10 October.

Race

Qualifying

The Boston Marathon is open to runners 18 or older from any nation, but they must meet certain qualifying standards. To qualify, a runner must first complete a standard marathon course certified by a national governing body affiliated with the World Athletics within a certain period of time before the date of the desired Boston Marathon (usually within approximately 18 months prior).

In the 1980s and 1990s, membership in USA Track & Field was required of all runners, but this requirement has been eliminated.

Qualifying standards for the 2013 race were tightened on February 15, 2011, by five minutes in each age-gender group for marathons run after September 23, 2011.  Prospective runners in the age range of 18–34 must run a time of no more than 3:00:00 (3 hours) if male, or 3:30:00 (3 hours 30 minutes) if female; the qualifying time is adjusted upward as age increases. In addition, the 59-second grace period on qualifying times has been completely eliminated; for example, a 40- to 44-year-old male will no longer qualify with a time of 3:10:01. For many marathoners, to qualify for Boston (to "BQ") is a goal and achievement in itself.

An exception to the qualification times is for runners who receive entries from partners. About one-fifth of the marathon's spots are reserved each year for charities, sponsors, vendors, licensees, consultants, municipal officials, local running clubs, and marketers. In 2010, about 5,470 additional runners received entries through partners, including 2,515 charity runners. The marathon currently allocates spots to two dozen charities who in turn are expected to raise more than $10 million a year.  In 2017, charity runners raised $34.2 million for more than 200 non-profit organizations.  The Boston Athletic Association's Official Charity Program raised $17.96 million, John Hancock's Non-Profit Program raised $12.3 million, and the last $3.97 million was raised by other qualified and invitational runners.

On October 18, 2010, the 20,000 spots reserved for qualifiers were filled in a record-setting eight hours and three minutes. The speed of registration prompted the B.A.A. to change its qualifying standards for the 2013 marathon onward.  In addition to lowering qualifying times, the change includes a rolling application process, which gives faster runners priority. Organizers decided not to significantly adjust the number of non-qualifiers.

On September 27, 2018, the B.A.A. announced that they were lowering the qualifying times for the 2020 marathon by another five minutes, with male runners in the 18-34 age group required to run a time of 3:00:00 (3 hours) or less and female runners in the 18-34 age group required to run a time of 3:30:00 (3 hours, 30 minutes) or less in order to qualify.

Race day
The race has traditionally been held on Patriots' Day, a state holiday in Massachusetts, and until 1969 that was every April 19, whichever day of the week that fell on. From 1969 to 2019, the holiday was observed on the third Monday in April and so the marathon date was correspondingly fixed to that Monday, often referred to by local residents as "Marathon Monday".

Starting times
Through 2005, the race began at noon (wheelchair race at 11:25a.m., and elite women at 11:31a.m.), at the official starting point in Hopkinton, Massachusetts. In 2006, the race used a staggered "wave start", where top-seeded runners (the elite men's group) and a first batch of up to 10,000 runners started at noon, with a second group starting at 12:30. The next year the starting times for the race were moved up, allowing runners to take advantage of cooler temperatures and enabling the roads to be reopened earlier. The marathon later added third and fourth waves to help further stagger the runners and reduce congestion.

The starting times for 2019 were:

 Men's Push Rim Wheelchair: 9:02 a.m.
 Women's Push Rim Wheelchair: 9:04 a.m.
 Handcycles and Duos: 9:25 a.m.
 Elite Women: 9:32 a.m.
 Elite Men: 10 a.m.
 Wave One: 10:02 a.m.
 Wave Two: 10:25 a.m.
 Wave Three: 10:50 a.m.
 Wave Four: 11:15 a.m.

Course 

The course runs through  of winding roads, following Route 135, Route 16, Route 30 and city streets into the center of Boston, where the official finish line is located at Copley Square, alongside the Boston Public Library. The race runs through eight Massachusetts cities and towns: Hopkinton, Ashland, Framingham, Natick, Wellesley, Newton, Brookline, and Boston.

The Boston Marathon is considered to be one of the more difficult marathon courses because of the Newton hills, which culminate in Heartbreak Hill near Boston College. This hill, which follows a  rise over a  stretch, forces many lesser-trained runners to a walking pace.

Heartbreak Hill
It is the last of four "Newton hills", which begin at the  mark and challenge contestants with late (if modest) climbs after the course's general downhill trend to that point. Though Heartbreak Hill itself rises only  vertically (from an elevation of ), it comes in the portion of a marathon distance where muscle glycogen stores are most likely to be depleted—a phenomenon referred to by marathoners as "hitting the wall".

It was on this hill that, in 1936, defending champion John A. "Johnny" Kelley overtook Ellison "Tarzan" Brown, giving him a consolatory pat on the shoulder as he passed. This gesture renewed the competitive drive in Brown, who rallied, pulled ahead of Kelley, and went on to win—thereby, it was said, breaking Kelley's heart.

Records

Because the course drops  from start to finish and the start is quite far west of the finish, allowing a helpful tailwind, the Boston Marathon does not satisfy two of the criteria necessary for the ratification of world or American records.

At the 2011 Boston Marathon on April 18, 2011, Geoffrey Mutai of Kenya ran a time of 2:03:02, which was the fastest ever marathon at the time (since surpassed by Eliud Kipchoge's 2:01:39 in Berlin 2018). However, due to the reasons listed above, Mutai’s performance was not ratified as an official world record. Bezunesh Deba from Ethiopia set the women's course record with a 2:19:59 performance on April 21, 2014. This was declared after Rita Jeptoo from Kenya was disqualified following a confirmed doping violation.

Other course records include:
Men's Masters: John Campbell (New Zealand), 2:11:04 (set in 1990)
Women's Masters: Firiya Sultanova-Zhdanova (Russia), 2:27:58 (set in 2002)
Men's Push Rim Wheelchair: Marcel Hug (Switzerland), 1:18:04 (set in 2017)
Women's Push Rim Wheelchair: Manuela Schär (Switzerland), 1:28:17 (set in 2017)
Men's Handcycle: Tom Davis (United States), 0:58:36 (set in 2017)
Women's Handcycle: Wendy Larsen (United States), 1:37:15 (set in 2021)

On only four occasions have world record times for marathon running been set in Boston. In 1947, the men's record time set was 2:25:39, by Suh Yun-Bok of South Korea. In 1975, a women's world record of 2:42:24 was set by Liane Winter of West Germany, and in 1983, Joan Benoit Samuelson of the United States ran a women's world record time of 2:22:43. In 2012 Joshua Cassidy of Canada set a men's wheelchair marathon world-record time of 1:18:25.

In 2007, astronaut Sunita Williams was an official entrant of the race, running a marathon distance while on the International Space Station, becoming the first person to run a marathon in space. She was sent a specialty bib and medal by the B.A.A. on the STS-117 flight of the Space Shuttle Atlantis.

The race's organizers keep a standard time clock for all entries, though official timekeeping ceases after the six-hour mark.

The B.A.A.

The Boston Athletic Association is a non-profit, organized sports association that organizes the Boston Marathon and other events.

Divisions
In 1975, the Boston Marathon became the first major marathon to include a wheelchair division competition. Bob Hall wrote race director Will Cloney to ask if he could compete in the race in his wheelchair. Cloney wrote back that he could not give Hall a race number, but would recognize Hall as an official finisher if he completed the race in under 3 hours and 30 minutes. Hall finished in 2 hours and 58 minutes, paving the way for the wheelchair division. Ernst Van Dyk, in 2004, set a course record at 1:18.29, almsot 50 minutes faster than the fastest runner.

Handcyclists have competed in the race since at least 2014. Starting in 2017, handcyclists are honored the same way runners and wheelchair racers are: with wreaths, prize money, and the playing of the men's and women's winners' national anthems.

In addition to the push rim wheelchair division, the Boston Marathon also hosts a blind/visually impaired division, and a mobility impaired program. Similar to the running divisions, a set of qualifying times has been developed for these divisions to motivate aspiring athletes and ensure competitive excellence. In 1986, the introduction of prize money at the Boston Marathon gave the push rim wheelchair division the richest prize purse in the sport. More than 1,000 people with disabilities and impairments have participated in the wheelchair division, while the other divisions have gained popularity each year. In 2013, 40 blind runners participated.

Memorial
The Boston Marathon Memorial in Copley Square, which is near the finish line, was installed to mark the one-hundredth running of the race. A circle of granite blocks set in the ground surrounds a central medallion that traces the race course and other segments that show an elevation map of the course and the names of the winners.

Notable features

Spectators
With approximately 500,000 spectators, the Boston Marathon is New England's most widely viewed sporting event.  About 1,000 media members from more than 100 outlets received media credentials in 2011.

For the entire distance of the race, thousands line the sides of the course to cheer the runners on, encourage them, and provide free water and snacks to the runners.

Scream Tunnel 

At Wellesley College, a women's college, it is traditional for the students to cheer on the runners in what is referred to as the Scream Tunnel. For about a quarter of a mile (400m), the students line the course, scream, and offer kisses. 
The Scream Tunnel is so loud runners claim it can be heard from a mile away. The tunnel is roughly half a mile (0.8km) prior to the halfway mark of the course.

Boston Red Sox
Every year, the Boston Red Sox play a home game at Fenway Park, starting at 11:05a.m. When the game ends, the crowd empties into Kenmore Square to cheer as the runners enter the final mile. This tradition started in 1903. In the 1940s, the Red Sox from the American League and the Boston Braves from the National League (who moved to Milwaukee after the 1953 season) alternated yearly as to which would play the morning game. In 2007, the game between the Red Sox and the Los Angeles Angels of Anaheim was delayed until 12:18p.m. due to heavy rain. The marathon, which had previously been run in a wide variety of weather conditions, was not delayed. The 2018 game hosting the Baltimore Orioles was postponed into May due to rain. And 2020 saw the game not played resulting from the pandemic.

Dick and Rick Hoyt
Dick and Rick Hoyt were one of the most recognized duos annually at the Boston Marathon.  Dick was the father of Rick, who has cerebral palsy. While doctors said Rick would never have a normal life and thought that institutionalizing him was the best option, Dick and his wife disagreed and raised him as an ordinary child. Eventually, a computer device was developed that helped Rick communicate with his family, and they learned that one of his biggest passions was sports.  "Team Hoyt" (Dick and Rick) started competing in charity runs, with Dick pushing Rick in a wheelchair. Through August 2008, Dick and Rick had competed in 66 marathons and 229 triathlons. Their fastest marathon finish was 2:40:47. The team completed their 30th Boston Marathon in 2012, when Dick was 72 and Rick was 50. They had intended the 2013 marathon to be their final one, but due to the Boston Marathon bombing, they were stopped a mile short of completing their run, and decided to run one more marathon the following year. They completed the 2014 marathon on April 21, 2014, having previously announced that it would be their last. In tribute to his connection with the race, Dick Hoyt was named the Grand Marshal of the 2015 marathon. Dick Hoyt died in 2021, aged 80.

Bandits
Unlike many other races, the Boston Marathon tolerated "bandits" (runners who do not register and obtain a bib number).  They used to be held back until after all the registered runners had left the starting line, and then were released in an unofficial fourth wave. They were generally not pulled off the course and mostly allowed to cross the finish line. For decades, these unofficial runners were treated like local folk heroes, celebrated for their endurance and spunk for entering a contest with the world's most accomplished athletes. Boston Marathon race director Dave McGillivray was once a teenage bandit.

Given the increased field that was expected for the 2014 Marathon, however, organizers planned "more than ever" to discourage bandits from running.  As of September 2015 the B.A.A. website states:
Q: Can I run in the Boston Marathon as an unofficial or "bandit" runner?
A: No, please do NOT run if you have not been officially entered in the race. Race amenities along the course and at the finish, such as fluids, medical care, and traffic safety, are provided based on the number of expected official entrants. Any addition to this by way of unofficial participants, adversely affects our ability to ensure a safe race for everyone.

Costumes
A number of people choose to run the course in a variety of costumes each year.  During the 100th running in 1996, one runner wore a scale model of the Old North Church steeple on his back. Old North Church is where the signal was lit that set Paul Revere off on his midnight ride, which is commemorated each year on the same day as the Marathon.  During the 2014 marathon, runners and spectators were discouraged from wearing "costumes covering the face or any non-form fitting, bulky outfits extending beyond the perimeter of the body," for security reasons following the 2013 bombing. However, state authorities and the Boston Athletic Association did not outright ban such costumes.

Ondekoza taiko drummers 

Starting in the mid 1970s, members of Ondekoza, a group from Japan, would run the marathon and right after finishing the race would start playing their taiko drums at the finish line. They repeated the tradition several times in the 1970s and 1980s. The  drum would be set up at the finish line to encourage runners finishing the marathon. Bill Rodgers was a guest on Sado Island and ran marathons in Japan with Ondekoza members. The group also ran the New York City Marathon and Los Angeles Marathon, and ran  of the perimeter of the United States from 1990 to 1993.

See also
 List of winners of the Boston Marathon
 List of marathon races in North America
 The Sports Museum (at TD Garden)

References

Further reading
 History of the Boston Marathon, Boston Marathon: The First Century of the World's Premier Running Event, by Tom Derderian, Human Kinetics Publishers, 1996, 634 pages, 
 Boston Marathon, updated third edition, by Tom Derderian 2017, 827 pages. , EBook, 978-1-5107-2429-7

External links

General reference
 Official Website of the Boston Marathon
 History of the Boston Marathon
 
 Boston Marathon: What to Expect on Race Day
 Boston Marathon Course Pace Band
 Weather history
 Course map and elevation
 Course elevation
 The 1918 Boston Marathon Military Relay

Photo and video stories
 Boston Marathon Photos-2005
 Boston Marathon Course Photos: Runner's View from Start to Finish

 
1897 establishments in Massachusetts
Annual events in Boston
Annual sporting events in the United States
April sporting events
Marathons in the United States
Recurring sporting events established in 1897
World Marathon Majors
Wheelchair marathons
Handcycling competitions